Boiga ranawanei, commonly known as Ranawana’s cat snake, is a species of snake in the family Colubridae. The species is endemic to Sri Lanka.

References

Reptiles described in 2005
Reptiles of Sri Lanka
ranawanei